Total primary energy supply (TPES) in Slovenia was 6.80 Mtoe in 2019. In the same year, electricity production was 16.1 TWh, consumption was 14.9 TWh.

Total energy
Total primary energy supply (TPES) in Slovenia was 6.80 Mtoe in 2019. The three greatest sources of energy in Slovenia during that year were oil (34.0% in 2019), nuclear power (22.0% in 2019), and coal (16.0% in 2019). The transportation and industrial sectors were the largest consumers of energy in Slovenia in 2019.

Slovenia is a net energy importer, importing all its petroleum products (mainly for the transport sector) and natural gas, as well as some coal.

Electricity
Electricity generation is mainly provided by nuclear power (36.2% in 2019), hydroelectricity (29.1% in 2019), and coal (27.9% in 2019); the three sources accounting for 93.2% of total electricity generation. Minor sources of electricity generation, each contributing less than 4% of total electricity generation, are natural gas, solar photovoltaic (solar PV), and biofuels. Following steep declines in use since 1990, Slovenia eliminated the use of oil for generating electricity in 2019. Renewable energy sources other than hydropower (e.g., biofuels, solar PV, waste, and wind) together provided 3.5% of total electricity generation in 2019.

Coal and lignite
Lignite deposits are found in the north central and northeastern regions of Slovenia; the country does not have any identified hard coal reserves. There is one active lignite mine in Slovenia, near Velenje in the north central region of the country. The mine produced 3.2 million tonnes of lignite in 2018 for combustion in the neighboring Šoštanj Power Plant. The mine is Slovenia's only producing fossil fuel facility. The power plant has an expected closure date of 2033 nonetheless the government hopes to close the plant between 2024 and 2029. 

Some coal is imported for district heating and electrical power generation use at the Ljubljana Power Station.

Hydroelectricity 
With abundant precipitation and numerous mountains, including the Julian Alps across the north of the country, Slovenia has significant hydropower natural resources.

Nuclear

The single nuclear reactor at the Krško Nuclear Power Plant near Krško in the eastern part of the country produced 22% of all of Slovenia's total energy needs in 2019. The plant generated 36.2% of the electricity produced in Slovenia. Designed by United States company Westinghouse, the two loop, light water, pressurized water reactor was constructed and is operated as a 50% / 50% joint venture between Slovenia and neighboring Croatia.

Slovenia electric company GEN Energija is seeking to construct a second nuclear reactor at the site to support national climate, electrification, and energy security goals.

Petroleum and natural gas
Slovenia has essentially no natural gas or petroleum reserves or production. In the late 2010s Slovenia began construction of two major gas interconnector projects, one with Hungary and Italy and one with Croatia and Austria, respectively.

Renewable energy
Hydropower is Slovenia's most significant renewable energy source for electricity generation; biofuels provided the greatest contribution to total energy needs among renewables. Variable renewable energy sources such as solar PV and wind produced 1.9% of electricity in 2019. 

Per analysis published by the World Bank which considers natural features of a location such as altitude, humidity, cloud cover, and topography,  Slovenia's solar PV potential is relatively low compared to global resources, but is comparable to that of other central and eastern European countries which lie north of the Alps. The sunny coastal strip along the Adriatic Sea has better potential than the inland areas, similar to that of northern Italy and southern France.

Onshore wind energy potential for Slovenia is typical of central and eastern Europe. A northwest to southeast band of higher potential wind energy is found across far southwest Slovenia, roughly between Gorizia, Italy and Rijeka, Croatia. Unlike the Atlantic Ocean and North Sea offshore areas of western and northern Europe, the offshore wind resources for Slovenia in the Adriatic Sea are not that much greater than onshore.

Climate change
Slovenia, both as an independent party and a member of the European Union, signed the Paris Agreement in 2016. The European Union Nationally
Determined Contribution (NDC) towards climate goals includes Slovenia. In the December 2020 update to the European Union NDC, Slovenia committed to the common goals and to reduce its emissions from outside of the European Union Emissions Trading Scheme by 15% from 2005 levels by 2030. For comparison, the four adjoining countries pledged the following reductions in the same document:
Austria 36%
Croatia 7%
Hungary 7%
Italy 33%

As a member of the European Union, Slovenia was required to prepare and submit a national energy and climate plan (NECP). Slovenia submitted their Integrated National Energy and Climate Plan of the Republic of Slovenia in February 2020. The country is seeking to move away from fossil fuels through electrification of areas of the economy such as transportation and heating with generation resources which emit little or no greenhouse gasses such as nuclear power and renewables.

Slovenia generated 68.8% of its electricity with zero carbon or carbon neutral sources in 2019, dominated by nuclear power and hydroelectricity. Fossil fuels oil, coal, and natural gas contributed 61% of the total energy supply of Slovenia in 2019.

See also 

Nuclear power in Slovenia
Renewable energy by country
List of power stations in Slovenia

References

External links